Richard Nangle (died c.1541) D.D., Provincial of the Order of Saint Augustine in Ireland was Bishop of Clonfert between 1536 and 1541.

References

Fellows of Trinity College Dublin
Bishops of Clonfert
Bishops of Kilfenora (Church of Ireland)
Bishops of Down and Connor (Church of Ireland)